The East Coast Line may refer to:

East Coast Line (Malaysia)
East Coast Line (Sweden)
East Coast Main Line, United Kingdom
Howrah–Chennai main line in India